The Women's College Coalition (WCC) was founded in 1972 and describes itself as an "association of women’s colleges and universities that are two- and four-year, public and private, religiously affiliated and secular."

Leadership
Chair: Ann McElaney-Johnson, Mount Saint Mary's University
President: Michele Ozumba, March 16, 2015
Directors:
Mary Hinton, President, College of Saint Benedict
Carine Feyten, Chancellor, Texas Woman's University
Jacquelyn Litt, Dean, Secretary/Treasurer, Douglass Residential College at Rutgers University
Kimberly Cassidy, President, Bryn Mawr College
Lorraine Sterrit, President, Salem College
Past Chairs: 
Elizabeth Kiss, President, Agnes Scott College
Joanne V. Creighton, President, Mount Holyoke College
Elizabeth Fleming, President, Converse College
Nancy Oliver Gray, President, Hollins University
Sharon Latchaw Hirsch, President, Rosemont College
Patricia McGuire, President, Trinity Washington University
Mary Meehan, President, Alverno College

Women's Colleges and Universities in the U.S. & Canada Represented by WCC 
Agnes Scott College
Alverno College
Barnard College
Bay Path College
Bennett College for Women
Brenau University
Brescia University College (Canada)
Bryn Mawr College
Cedar Crest College
College of Saint Benedict
College of Saint Mary
Cottey College
Hollins University
Mary Baldwin University
Meredith College
Mills College
Moore College of Art and Design
Mount Holyoke College
Mount St. Mary's College
Mount Saint Vincent University (Canada)*
Notre Dame of Maryland University
Russell Sage College of The Sage Colleges
Saint Mary's College
Salem College
Scripps College
Simmons College
Smith College
Spelman College
St. Catherine University
Stephens College
Sweet Briar College
Texas Woman's University*
Trinity Washington University
Wellesley College
Wesleyan College
* Female focused coeducational institutions

See also
List of current and historical women's universities and colleges in the United States
Timeline of women's colleges in the United States
Seven Sisters (colleges)
Women's colleges in the Southern United States
Women's colleges in the United States

Notes

External links
A Profile of Recent Women's College Graduates, '67/77

+
College and university associations and consortia in North America
Organizations established in 1972
Trade associations based in the United States